Young-ha, spelled Yong-ha in North Korea, is a Korean unisex given name. Its meaning depends on the hanja used to write each syllable of the name. There are 34 hanja with the reading "young" and 24 hanja with the reading "ha" on the South Korean government's official list of hanja which may be registered for use in given names.

People with this name include:
Chu Yong-ha (1908–?), North Korean politician and diplomat
Lee Young-ha (born 1951), South Korean actor
Kim Young-ha (born 1968), South Korean writer
Lee Young-ha (baseball) (born 1997), South Korean baseball player
Lee Yeong-ha, South Korean speed skater, flag bearer for South Korea at the 1992 Winter Olympics

See also
List of Korean given names

References

Korean unisex given names